Rathsun or Rathsoon is a village and block located in the Jammu and Kashmir's Budgam district. It is situated at the base of the Pir Panjal Range of the Himalayas. It falls under the administrative division of tehsil Beerwah one of the nine tehsils of district Budgam. It is about 23.7 km (14.7 miles) via Beerwah-Budgam Road from district headquarters Budgam, 7 km (4.3 mi) from sub-district headquarters Beerwah, known as the Gateway of Doodhpathri and Gateway of Tosamaidan, and 29 km (18 mile) away from Srinagar, the summer capital of Jammu and Kashmir.

The Sukhnag (Sokhanag) River, known locally as the spring of solace, passes through Rathsun.

Geography 
It is located at an elevation of 1,595 m (5,232 ft) above the sea level. The landscape, mostly the agricultural field area, is made up of plateau-like terraces known as karewas.

Demographics

Population 
As of 2011 census, the population of Rathsun is 5,907 of which 3,191 are males while the remaining 2,716 are females and a total number of 1488 children below 6 years as per the report. There are about 596 houses in Rathsun village.

Religion

Economy
Much of the local economy is agricultural crops and some small time businesses such as shops and handicrafts.

Transport

The nearest airport from Rathsun is Sheikh ul-Alam International Airport. The nearest railway station is the Mazhom railway station.

Education
The 'Government Boys High School' is one of the oldest high school and besides this some middle and primary schools are also operational in the village.

See also 
Pethmakhama
Aasar-i-Shareef Pethmakhama
Beerwah, Jammu and Kashmir
Aripanthan
Onagam
Chewdara

References

External links 

Villages in Budgam district
Villages in Beerwah tehsil